Héctor Guerra Garcia (born 6 August 1978 in Madrid) is a Spanish former professional road cyclist and triathlete.

Major results

2002
 2nd Overall Vuelta Ciclista a León
 6th Clásica a los Puertos
2003
 4th Clásica a los Puertos
2004
 9th Clásica a los Puertos
2005
 4th Overall Tour du Poitou-Charentes
 5th Overall G.P. Internacional do Oeste RTP
 7th Overall Volta ao Algarve
2006
 2nd Overall Volta a Portugal
 7th Overall Volta ao Algarve
 10th Overall Volta ao Distrito de Santarém
2007
 1st Clásica a los Puertos
 3rd Overall Volta a Portugal
1st Stage 10 (ITT)
 3rd Overall Troféu Joaquim Agostinho
 6th Overall Volta ao Alentejo
 6th Overall Volta ao Distrito de Santarém
2008
 1st  Overall Volta ao Alentejo
1st Stage 3 (ITT)
 1st GP Llodio
 2nd Overall Volta a Portugal
1st Stage 10 (ITT)
 4th Overall Volta ao Distrito de Santarém
 4th Overall Volta ao Algarve
2009
 1st  Overall Troféu Joaquim Agostinho
1st Prologue & Stage 3
 1st  Overall Vuelta a la Comunidad de Madrid
1st Stage 1 (ITT)
 2nd Overall Volta ao Alentejo
1st Stage 3 (ITT)
 5th Subida al Naranco
 9th Overall Vuelta a Asturias
1st Stage 3b (ITT)

References

1978 births
Living people
Spanish male cyclists
Cyclists from Madrid